Lunkány is the Hungarian name for three villages in Romania:

 Luncani village, Mărgineni Commune, Bacău County
 Luncani village, Topliţa City, Harghita County
 Luncani village, Boșorod Commune, Hunedoara County